Leo Vincent McPartlan (2 August 1903 – June 1982) was an Australian politician.

He was born in Hobart. In 1953 he was elected to the Tasmanian House of Assembly for Denison in a countback following the resignation of Bill Wedd. McPartlan, like Wedd, was an independent. In 1955 he contested Franklin, but was defeated.

References

1903 births
1982 deaths
Independent members of the Parliament of Tasmania
Members of the Tasmanian House of Assembly
Politicians from Hobart
20th-century Australian politicians